Kinetic (Ancient Greek: κίνησις “kinesis”, movement or to move) may refer to:

 Kinetic theory, describing a gas as particles in random motion
 Kinetic energy, the energy of an object that it possesses due to its motion

Art and entertainment
 Kinetic art, a form of art involving mechanical and/or random movement, including optical illusions.
 Kinetic, the 13th episode of the first season of the TV series Smallville
 Kinetic (comics), a comic by Allan Heinberg and Kelley Pucklett
 "Kinetic" (song), a song by Radiohead

Companies
 Kinetic Engineering Limited, Indian automotive manufacturer
 Kinetic Group, Australian-based public transport company

Technology
 "Kinetic", Seiko's trademark for its automatic quartz technology
 The Kinetic camera system by Birt Acres (1854–1918), photographer and film pioneer
 Kinetic projectile

Military terminology
 Kinetic military action

See also
 
 
 Kinetics (disambiguation)
 Dynamics (disambiguation)
 Qinetiq, an international defence technology company
 Kinetica, a 2001 futuristic racing video game for the PlayStation 2